Union Sportive Esch-Alzette is a football club, based in Esch-sur-Alzette, Luxembourg. The club won the second division Promotion d'Honneur in the 2016–17 season and gained promotion to the Luxembourg National Division. The club colours are blue and white.

Current squad

References

Esch